Norwegian Institute for Agricultural and Environmental Research (Bioforsk) is a national Norwegian R&D institute specialising in the fields of agriculture
and food production, environmental protection and natural resource
management. Furthermore, Bioforsk focuses on research-based
innovation, value creation and sustainable resource utilisation.
Bioforsk aims to be a regionally, nationally and internationally competitive
knowledge producer and service provider.

Organisation
Bioforsk was established on 1 January 2006, after a merger of the
Norwegian Centre for Soil and Environmental Research, the Norwegian
Institute for Crop Research and the Norwegian Centre for Organic Agriculture.
Bioforsk has a staff of about 500. Bioforsk is organised under the Norwegian Ministry of Agriculture and Food.
The institute consists of seven research divisions, a laboratory and numerous branches spread throughout the
country, thus ensuring proximity to both market and challenges. Bioforsk’s
management team and central administration are located in Ås, 30 km
south of Oslo.

The Bioforsk Plant Health and Plant Protection Division is in charge of
R&D related to plant health and plant protection. The division specialises
in the fields of plant diseases, weeds, pests, climate effects, genetics and
biotechnology. Important R&D areas include integrated plant protection,
biological pest control and pest forecasting systems. The division is
furthermore involved in such fields as agrometeorology, ecotoxicology and
risk analysis. The Plant Health and Plant Protection Centre is located in Ås.

The Bioforsk Soil and Environment Division is in charge of soil
and environmental research. The division is specialised in the
fields of soil science, soil pollution, ecotoxicology, waste management, wastewater and ecological engineering, hydrology,
water quality, land use and terrestrial climate effects. The
division’s main office is in Ås, but there is also a branch in Svanvik
in eastern Finnmark, close to the Russian and Finnish borders, with
a specific focus on environmental issues in the Barents Region. The
branch also includes the Svanhovd Conference Centre and the
Visitor’s Centre of the Øvre Pasvik National Park.

The Bioforsk Arable Crops Division is in charge of R&D related to
cereals, oilseed crops, peas, seed production, potatoes,
vegetables and herbs. The division also conducts research on such
areas as berries, forage crops, lawn grass, small livestock, organic
agriculture, precision farming and farm-based rural development
in the mountain regions. The main office is in Kapp in Hedmark County, but there are branches throughout eastern Norway, where,
due to natural conditions, most of the country’s arable crops are
grown.

The Bioforsk Horticulture and Urban Greening Division is in
charge of R&D related to fruit and berry crops, greenhouse
production of vegetables and berries, Christmas trees and cut
greens, as well as the establishment and maintenance of urban green space, including sports and amenity turf. The division also
focuses on roughage production and cultural landscape
management. The main office is in Klepp in Rogaland County, just
south of Stavanger, and there are three branches in other parts of
western Norway: two in Sogn & Fjordane and one in Hordaland.

The Bioforsk Grassland and Landscape Division is in charge of
R&D related to grassland management, roughage production and
the cultural landscape. The division, which is based at Stjørdal to
the north of Trondheim, also conducts research on cereals,
berries, vegetables, potatoes, greenhouse crops and bioenergy.

The Bioforsk Organic Food and Farming Division is a national
centre of expertise, in charge of R&D related to organic agriculture and organic food production. The division’s activities cover the entire value chain from “farm to table”. The division is
based at Tingvoll in north-western Norway (Møre og Romsdal
County).

The Bioforsk Arctic Agriculture and Land Use Division is in
charge of R&D related to Arctic agriculture and the utilisation of
wilderness and rangeland resources. The division has special
expertise in the fields of wild berry production, utilisation of
uncultivated land and freshwater fisheries. The division also has a
regional responsibility for facilitating an innovative development
of agriculture and land use in northern Norway. The main office is
in the Arctic metropolis of Tromsø, with two branches in Nordland
County (Tjøtta and Bodø).

External links
www.bioforsk.no

Research institutes in Norway